Bad Ischl (Austrian German ) is a spa town in Austria. It lies in the southern part of Upper Austria, at the Traun River in the centre of the Salzkammergut region. The town consists of the Katastralgemeinden Ahorn, Bad Ischl, Haiden, Jainzen, Kaltenbach, Lauffen, Lindau, Pfandl, Perneck, Reiterndorf and Rettenbach. It is connected to the village of Strobl by the river Ischl, which drains from the Wolfgangsee, and to the Traunsee, into which the stream empties. It is home to the Kaiservilla, summer residence of Austro-Hungarian monarchs Emperor Franz Joseph I and Empress Elisabeth. In 2024, Bad Ischl will be one of the European Capitals of Culture – the third city in Austria after Graz (2003) and Linz (2009).

History

Bad Ischl was a settlement area since the Hallstatt culture, first mentioned in a 1262 deed as Iselen. In 1419 Archduke Albert V of Austria established the local seat of the Salt Chamber (Salzkammer) at Wildenstein Castle, and Ischl was granted the privileges of a market town in 1466 by Emperor Frederick III. A first salt mine was opened in 1563, a salt evaporation pond (Saline) followed in 1571.

When in the early 19th century brine came into use for medical purposes, Ischl soon became a fashionable spa resort with notable guests like Prince Klemens Wenzel von Metternich and Archduke Franz Karl of Austria. The Hotel Post opened in 1828 was the first one in the whole Salzkammergut area. In 1849 Franz Karl's son, Emperor Franz Joseph I of Austria chose the town for his summer residence.

On 19 August 1853 the engagement between Franz Joseph and Elisabeth of Bavaria (Sisi) took place at the Seeauerhaus, Esplanade No. 10, which since 1989 has been the location of the Museum der Stadt Bad Ischl.

In 1854, the Emperor's mother, Archduchess Sophie, gave him the Kaiservilla (Imperial Villa) as a wedding present. The villa became the imperial family's summer residence; Franz Joseph described it as "Heaven on Earth". He also granted a nearby mansion to mistress Katharina Schratt, that could be easily reached via a hidden footpath. In the Kaiservilla on 28 July 1914 Franz Joseph signed the declaration of war against the Kingdom of Serbia, signalling the start of World War I. He left Bad Ischl on the following day and never returned. The villa is still owned by the Habsburg-Lorraine family, although the grounds and parts of the residence are now open to the public.

In the aftermath of the defeat of Germany in World War II, Bad Ischl was the location of a displaced persons (DP) camp for survivors of the Holocaust and Nazi concentration camps in Eastern Europe. The resident displaced persons were primarily Jews from Poland and other neighboring countries. They were provided with lodging, food, medical care and administrative assistance until they were able to make other, more permanent arrangements. Many left for the United States, Israel and Canada. The Bad Ischl DP camp remained active from 1945 through 1952.

Population

Approximately 15% of the city's population was foreign born in 2019.

Sights

 
Besides the Kaiservilla, the city offers several health spas and tourist attractions, like the historic Kongresshaus opened in 1875, the new Kurhaus built by Clemens Holzmeister in 1932, as well as the Lehár Villa, the former residence of Franz Lehár, that he acquired in 1912 and today serves as a museum. The Saint Nicholas parish church was first mentioned in a 1344 deed.

Bad Ischl is also known for the Konditorei Zauner pastry shop, former k.u.k. purveyor established in 1832, and the small Lehártheater built in 1827.

A gondola lift runs from the town up to the Katrin alpine pasture at 1415 m (4643 ft), which offers a panoramic view of the Salzkammergut mountains. The ruins of Wildenstein Castle, which burnt down in 1715, are nearby.

The Bad Ischl Cemetery is listed by the State of Upper Austria as a protected historical site. Amongst those buried there are the composers Franz Lehár, Rudi Gfaller, and Oscar Straus.

Notable people 

 Leopold Hasner von Artha (1818 in Prague - 1891 in Bad Ischl), politician
 Helmut Berger, (born 1944 in Bad Ischl), actor of narcissistic and ambiguous characters.
 Karl Eglseer (1890 in Bad Ischl – 1944) a general in the Wehrmacht
 Leopold Engleitner, (1905 in Aigen - 2013), conscientious objector, grew up in Bad Ischl.
 Rudi Gfaller (1882 in Vienna – 1972 in Bad Ischl), an operetta composer and singer
 Jörg Haider (1950–2008), politician, attended school in Bad Ischl.
 Franz Lehár (1870 in Komárno 1870 - 1948 in Bad Ischl), operetta composer
 Roger Lewis (born 1960), a Welsh academic, biographer and journalist; lives in Bad Ischl.
 Jacques de Menasce (1905 in Bad Ischl - 1960), a composer, pianist and critic 
 Wilhelm von Mirbach (1871 in Bad Ischl – 1918 in Moscow) assassinated German diplomat.
 Leo Perutz, (1882 in Prague - 1957 in Bad Ischl), an Austrian novelist and mathematician.
 Resi Pesendorfer (1902 in Bad Ischl - 1989) a resistance activist opposing Austrofascism
 Udo Plamberger (born 1971 in Bad Ischl) a former professional tennis player
 Josef Plieseis (1913 in Bad Ischl - 1966 in Bad Ischl), communist Widerstand fighter
 Wolfram von Richthofen (1895-1945), German field marshal, died in captivity at Bad Ischl
 Viktor Schauberger (1885–1958), was an Austrian forester/forest warden, naturalist, philosopher, inventor and Biomimicry experimenter.
 Oscar Straus, (1870 in Vienna - 1954 in Bad Ischl), composer of operettas and film scores
 Therese Wiet (1885 in Vienna – 1971 in Bad Ischl), an Austrian operetta and concert singer

Twin towns 
 Gödöllő,  Hungary
 Opatija,  Croatia
 Sarajevo,  Bosnia-Herzegovina

See also
Lauffen

References

External links

 Bad Ischl's government website
 Bad Ischl Tourist Board
 In 1854,the Imperial Villa at Bad-Ischl was given as a wedding gift to Franz Joseph by his mother.
 

Cities and towns in Gmunden District
Spa towns in Austria